Robbins Island may refer to:
Robbins Island (Antarctica)
Robbins Island (Tasmania)

See also
Robben Island, Cape Province, South Africa
Robins Island, Long Island, New York, U.S.A.